Richard LaBrie is an American clinical psychologist and Emmy-nominated editor, director, producer, and writer.

Early life and education
LaBrie received his doctorate in clinical psychology (Psy.D.) from The California School of Professional Psychology at Alliant International University in 2015. He graduated from the Tisch School of the Arts at New York University in 1983.

Career

Psychologist
LaBrie works primarily as a clinical psychologist in private practice in Pasadena, CA.

Editor
LaBrie formerly worked primarily as an editor. His editing credits include television shows such as Mad TV, Woke Up Dead, Workaholics, and Key and Peele.

Emmy Nomination
In 2015, for his work editing Comedy Central's Key and Peele, LaBrie earned his first Emmy nomination.  He was nominated again for editing Comedy Central's Key and Peele in 2016.

Director
LaBrie has directed two feature-length films - Good Luck starring Vincent D'Onofrio, and Joe's Rotten World.

Awards and nominations

References

External links

American film editors
Living people
Tisch School of the Arts alumni
Year of birth missing (living people)